Ribeiro is a Spanish Denominación de Origen Protegida (DOP) (Denominación de Orixe Protexida in Galician) for wines located in the northwest of the province of Ourense (Galicia, Spain), in the valleys formed by the rivers Miño, Arnoia, and Avia. It has an area of 30 km2 including 9 municipalities in their entirety and parts of four others.

History
Ribeiro has a long tradition of producing and exporting wine from the Galician Atlantic ports. It is believed that the first vineyards were planted by the ancient Romans. From the Middle Ages up to the 18th century, the area was renowned for its sweet wines (vinos tostados), which were produced here long before they were produced in the Canary Islands or in Andalusia. They were made from sun-dried grapes and were known as Ribadavia. They were drunk by the pilgrims passing through the area on their way to Santiago. Significant quantities of white fortified Ribadavia wines were exported to England in the 17th and 18th centuries.

Nowadays, white Ribeiro wines are known for their fresh, slightly acidic, fruity character.

Soils
The vineyards are at altitudes of between 75 and 400 m above sea level in the valleys and on the slopes which can sometimes be very steep. The use of terraces (known locally as socalcos or bocaribeiras) is common.

The soils are deep (between 70 and 100 cm) and basically of granitic origin with a significant content of stones and gravel,

which improve the structure of the soil and reflect sunlight onto the vines.

The soil texture is mainly sandy. Organic matter content varies between 2% and 4%. The soils in the area have a tendency to acidify, and this is corrected by the grape growers.

Climate
The climate is a transition zone between oceanic and Mediterranean, so it is humid and temperate, with average annual temperatures of 14.5 °C. The grapes generally have no problem ripening and conserve all their aroma and acidity. In addition, there are natural barriers that protect the area from Atlantic storms.

Average annual rainfall is high (950 mm) though there are three months in the summer when it is very sparse.
The vines receive a maximum of around 1900 hours of sunlight per year.

Grapes
White wine represents about 95% of the wine produced, and is most commonly produced with the Treixadura variety. The Recommended white grapes are: Treixadura, Torrontés, Godello, Loureira, Albariño; also authorized are Palomino, Albillo, and Macabeo.

The Recommended red grapes are: Caíño tinto, Caiño Longo, Caiño Bravo, Sousón, Ferrón, Mencía, Brancellao; also authorized are Tempranillo and Garnacha tintorera.

See also
Galician wine
Spanish wine

References

External links
 D.O. Ribeiro official website

Wine regions of Spain
Spanish wine
Appellations
Wine classification
Galicia (Spain)